The Besson MB.35 Passe Partout was a French two-seat spotter and observation floatplane, designed by Besson. It was intended to serve on Surcouf a very large (for its day) submarine, stowed in a sealed hangar. The first aircraft was destroyed during trials and the second was converted to the MB.41, prototype of the Besson MB.411, which did serve on Surcouf.

Operators

French Navy

Specification (MB.35)

References

Bibliography

1920s French military reconnaissance aircraft
Besson aircraft